Ralph (born  2009) was a Continental Giant rabbit from Sussex, United Kingdom who weighed nearly .

Ralph was recognised as the world's heaviest rabbit by Guinness World Records in 2010. He was dethroned in 2010 by Darius, another Continental Giant, before regaining the title as a 4-year-old in 2013. Ralph was one of 32 children of Amy, who was also the world's heaviest rabbit prior to her death from a heart attack in May 2009. Ralph's father Roberto was also formerly the world's heaviest rabbit. 

Ralph ate £50 worth of food per week. His diet included a variety of vegetables, including broccoli, cabbage, carrots, cucumber, sweetcorn, and watercress, as well as brown bread, cream crackers, and Weetabix. Ralph's owner was Pauline Grant and he lived at Sussex Horse Rescue in Uckfield, where his keeper was Ella McDonnell. Ralph once traveled to London to meet spiritual medium Derek Acorah, who speculated that his great size could be due to possession. Grant, who believed her house to be haunted, said that Acorah had a "good old chat with Ralph about the spirits in our house. He seemed to think Ralph was channelling the spirit of a ghoul." Ralph was featured by Bedtime Math as a subject of their arithmetic problems. In December 2014, the US Federal Aviation Administration (FAA) released a "Know Before You Fly" video warning drone operators not to fly uncrewed aircraft heavier than Ralph lest they get on the agency's "naughty list".

In April 2021, Darius was stolen from the garden of his owner's home.

See also
Largest organisms

References

Male mammals
Individual rabbits
Individual animals in England
Sussex